Many species of arthropods (insects, arachnids, millipedes and centipedes) can bite or sting human beings. These bites and stings generally occur as a defense mechanism or during normal arthropod feeding. While most cases cause self-limited irritation, medically relevant complications include envenomation, allergic reactions, and transmission of vector-borne diseases.

Signs and symptoms 

Most arthropod bites and stings cause self-limited redness, itchiness and/or pain around the site. Rarely (1-3% of Hymenoptera sting reactions), systemic reactions can affect multiple organs and pose a medical emergency, as in the case of anaphylactic shock.

Defensive and predatory bites and stings 
Many arthropods bite or sting in order to immobilize their prey or deter potential predators as a defense mechanism. Stings containing venom are more likely to be painful. Less frequently, venomous spider bites are also associated with morbidity and mortality in humans.

Most arthropod stings involve Hymenoptera (ants, wasps, and bees). While the  majority of Hymenoptera stings are locally painful, their associated venom rarely cause toxic reactions unless victims receive many stings at once. The low mortality (around 60 deaths per year in the US out of unreported millions of stings nationwide) associated with Hymenoptera is mostly due to anaphylaxis from venom hypersensitivity.

Most scorpion stings also cause self-limited pain or paresthesias. Only certain species (from family Buthidae) inject neurotoxic venom, responsible for most morbidity and mortality. Severe toxic reactions can occur resulting in progressive hemodynamic instability, neuromuscular dysfunction, cardiogenic shock, pulmonary edema, multi-organ failure, and death. Although robust epidemiological data is unavailable, global estimates of scorpion stings exceed 1.2 million resulting in more than 3000 deaths annually.

Spider bites most often cause minor symptoms and resolve without intervention. Medically significant spider bites involve substantial envenomation from only certain species such as widow spiders and recluse spiders. Symptoms of latrodectism (from widow spiders) may include pain at the bite or involve the chest and abdomen, sweating, muscle cramps and vomiting among others. By comparison, loxoscelism (from recluse spiders) can present with local necrosis of the surrounding skin and widespread breakdown of red blood cells. Headaches, vomiting and a mild fever may also occur.

Feeding bites 
Feeding bites have characteristic patterns and symptoms that reflect feeding habits of the offending pest and the chemistry of its saliva. Feeding bites are less likely to be felt at the time of the bite, although there are some exceptions. Since feeding requires longer attachment to prey than envenomation, feeding bites are more often associated with vector transmission of disease.

As vectors of disease 

In addition to stings and bites causing discomfort in of themselves, bites can also spread secondary infections if the arthropod is carrying a virus, bacteria, or parasite. The World Health Organization (WHO) estimates that 17% of all infectious diseases worldwide were transmitted by arthropod vectors, resulting in over 700,000 deaths annually. The table below lists common arthropod vectors and their associated diseases. The figure below represents endemic areas of common vector-borne diseases.

*Estimated global number of cases annually according to WHO in 2017. If a vector transmits multiple diseases, aggregate case numbers are listed. Rough estimates are only meant to provide a sense of scale. Unknown disease burden is listed as NA for not available.

Diagnosis 

Most arthropod bites and stings do not require a specific diagnosis since they typically improve with supportive management alone. Certain bites and stings present with characteristic appearances and distributions. In general, however, dermoscopic findings of bitten or stung skin rarely aid in diagnosis. Rather, patient history (recent travel to endemic areas, outdoor activities, and other risk factors) primarily guides the diagnostic approach, which can raise clinical suspicion for more serious complications like vector-borne diseases.

Microscopic appearance

Skin biopsies are not indicated for bites or stings, since the histomorphologic appearance is non-specific. Bites and stings as well as other conditions (e.g. drug reactions, urticarial reactions, and early bullous pemphigoid) can cause microscopic changes such as a wedge-shaped superficial dermal perivascular infiltrate consisting of abundant lymphocytes and scattered eosinophils, as shown in the adjacent figure:

Prevention 
Prevention strategies against arthropod bites and stings comprise measures for personal protection, travel advisories, public health and environmental concerns.

Personal protection 
Travelers should seek to minimize outdoor activity during peak activity times and avoid high risk areas such as regions with known outbreaks or epidemics. Standing water and dense vegetation also commonly attract arthropods. Clothes covering most exposed skin can also provide a measure of physical protection, which may be augmented when the fabric is treated with pesticides such as Permethrin. Topical repellants such as N,N-diethyl-m-toluamide (DEET) is supported by a large body of evidence.

Vaccines may also help prevent vector-borne diseases for eligible patients. For example, Japanese encephalitis, Yellow fever, and Dengue fever have FDA-approved vaccines available. Since they are relatively new vaccines, however, they are not standard of care as of 2023. Additionally, patients traveling to Malaria endemic regions are routinely prescribed Malaria chemoprophylaxis.

Patients with a history of venom hypersensitivity may benefit from venom immunotherapy (VIT). Patient eligibility for VIT includes a prior anaphylactic reaction to a venomous sting and who have IgE to venom allergens. VIT can help prevent future severe systemic reactions in select patients.

Global health 
International organizations such as WHO aim to reduce disease burdens of neglected tropical diseases, many of which are vector borne. Such campaigns must incorporate multipronged approaches to consider global inequality, access to resources, and climate change.

Management 
Most arthropod bites and stings require only supportive care. However, complications such as envenomation and severe allergic reactions can present as medical emergencies.

Supportive care 
Local reactions to bites and stings are treated symptomatically. If a stinger is still embedded, manual removal can reduce further irritation. Washing the affected area with soap and water can help reduce risk of contamination. Oral antihistamines, calamine lotion, topical corticosteroids and cold compresses are common over the counter remedies to reduce itchiness and local inflammation. In more severe cases, such as large local reactions, systemic glucocorticoids are sometimes prescribed, although limited evidence supports their effectiveness. There are limited data to support one treatment over another.

Medical emergencies 
Systemic reactions from venom hypersensitivity can rapidly progress to a medical emergency. The mainstay of anaphylactic shock management is intramuscularly injected epinephrine. The patient should be stabilized and transferred to an intensive care unit.

Toxic reactions to envenomation are similarly managed with medical stabilization and symptomatic treatment. Tetanus prophylaxis should be up to date but antibiotics are typically unnecessary unless a bacterial superinfection is suspected. Antivenom drugs have been created for certain species such as Centruroides scorpion stings, but these drugs are not yet widely available and so typically reserved for severe systemic toxicity.

Several vector-borne diseases can present emergently.

Treatment of vector-borne diseases 
After confirmation of diagnosis, antimicrobials are prescribed according to standard of care.

Biting and stinging arthropods 
 A bite is defined as coming from the mouthparts of the arthropod. The bite consists of both the bite wound and the saliva. The saliva of the arthropod may contain anticoagulants, as in insects and arachnids which feed from blood. Feeding bites may also contain anaesthetic, to prevent the bite from being felt. Feeding bites may also contain digestive enzymes, as in spiders; spider bites have primarily evolved to paralyse and then digest prey. A sting comes from the abdomen; in most insects (which are all largely hymenopterans), the stinger is a modified ovipositor, which protrudes from the abdomen. The sting consists of an insertion wound, and venom. The venom is evolved to cause pain to a predator, paralyse a prey item, or both. Because insect stingers evolved from ovipositors, in most hymenopterans only the female can sting. However, there are a few orders of wasp where the male has evolved a "pseudo sting" - the male genitalia has evolved two sharp protrusions which can deliver an insertion wound. However, they do not contain venom, so they are not considered a true sting. In ants that bite instead of sting, such as the Formicinae, the bite causes the wound, but during the bite the abdomen bends forward to spray formic acid into the wound, causing additional pain. In arachnids that sting (all largely scorpians), the stinger is not a modified ovipositor, but instead a metasoma that bears a telson. (Scorpians lack an ovipositor entirely and give birth to live young.)

Insects

Diptera (True flies) 
 Black flies (Simuliidae)
 Horse-flies (Tabanidae)
 Deer flies/Yellow flies (Chrysops)
 Tsetse flies (Glossinidae)
 Stable flies (Muscidae)
 Biting midges or No see-ums (Ceratopogonidae)
 Highland midge
 Mosquitos (Culicidae)
 Botflies (as larvae, Oestridae)
 Sandflies (Phlebotomidae)
 Lutzomyia
 Phlebotomus
 Blow-flies (as larvae, Calliphoridae)
 Screw-worm flies (as larvae, Calliphoridae)
 Hippoboscidae (Keds)

Hymenoptera 
 Ants
 Bull ants (sting)
 Fire ants (both bite and sting)
 Bees
 Honeybees (sting)
 Stingless bees (bite)
 Bumblebees (sting)
 Wasps (sting)
 Hornets (sting)
 Yellow Jackets (sting)

Siphonaptera (Fleas) 
 Fleas (bite)
 Human flea Pulex irritans
 Chigoe flea Tunga penetrans

Phthiraptera (Lice) 
 Lice (bite)
 Head lice
 Body lice
 Crab lice

Other insects 
 Assassin bug/Kissing bug
 Bedbugs
 Conenose bug

Arachnids

Spiders

Mites 

 Chiggers

 Red Poultry Mite
 Spiny rat mite
 House mouse mite
 Northern fowl mite
 Tropical fowl mite
 Mange mite
 Scabies
 Ticks

Scorpions 

 All species sting

Myriapoda 
 Centipedes

References

External links 

 Identifying insect bites and stings
 Diagnosing Mysterious "Bug Bites"

Lists of animals
Medical lists
Arthropods and humans
Parasitic infestations, stings, and bites of the skin
Arthropod attacks